Torrance High School is a high school located in Torrance, California. Founded in 1917, it is one of the oldest high schools in continuous use in California and is the oldest of the four high schools in the Torrance Unified School District. Four of its buildings are listed on the U.S. National Register of Historic Places.

Torrance High School is a popular filming location for television and motion picture production. It is most widely known for its appearance in high-profile television shows, including Beverly Hills, 90210 and Buffy the Vampire Slayer. It is the alma mater of broadcaster Paul Moyer, Medal of Honor recipient Ted Tanouye, World War II prisoner of war Louis Zamperini, professional golfer Angela Park and professional golfer Jenny Shin.

School history
Torrance High School first opened on September 11, 1917, under the jurisdiction of the Los Angeles High School District, as a combination high school and elementary school to accommodate the area's rapid post-World War I growth brought on by the region's petroleum industry and iron works, as well as the Pacific Electric Railway expansion. Upon its opening in 1917, the school consisted of 10 rooms, seven of which were used for classrooms. 

Torrance High's first commencement ceremony took place on June 18, 1918, during which two female students received their diplomas. As the population of students at Torrance High grew, new buildings were constructed to accommodate the increasing student body. Additions were added to the main building in 1921 which included the senior patio and fountain. By 1923, two additional buildings - the home economics wing and auditorium - were constructed on both sides of the main building. The growing number of high school students led to the construction of a separate building to serve elementary students. Known today as the Torrance High Annex, the building remained an elementary school until 1963 when it was annexed by Torrance High. A school newspaper was established in 1922 called The Tentacle. It was changed to the Torrance News Torch in 1926 to better match with the school yearbook's name, The Torch. More additions to the school were made in the late 1920s, including a gymnasium and a print shop to print the newspaper and yearbook.  

In 1947 Torrance Unified School District—TUSD was formed but was not certified for a high school. During the school year of fall 1947 to summer 1948, Torrance High School was part of the Redondo Union High School District, as the Torrance School District split from the Los Angeles City School District and Los Angeles City High School District, but California law prevented the newly-formed Torrance school district from immediately controlling high schools. Torrance High joined what became Torrance Unified School District the following year. Torrance High has a series of underground bomb shelters located throughout the school, dating back from the Cold War era. The very first graduating high school class from Torrance Unified School District was the Class of 1948.

Demographics
In 2018–2019 school year, Torrance High had an enrollment of 1,959.

 Hispanic or Latino - 41%
 Asian - 19%
 White -  15%
 Filipino - 12%
 Two or more races - 6%
 Black - 4%
Other/Unreported - ~2%

The average gross income of Torrance High's ZIP code (90501) is $46,839.

Campus

Torrance High has over 100 classrooms; a library; access to site, district, and county media resources; five computer labs; at least one computer per classroom; two gyms; and local athletic fields.

The Main Building 1917 with the 1921 'L wing' additions, the Senior Patio, the 1921 original Science Building—current Home Economics Building, the Streamline Moderne style 1937 Auditorium, and the first 1923  Torrance Elementary School, now referred to as the Annex: are all listed on the National Register of Historic Places (in 1983).  These were Torrance's first such landmark listings.  In 1921 a scenic Spanish Colonial Revival glazed tile fountain and Mexican Saltillo tile patio was added to Torrance High's Mediterranean Revival style Main Building, along with the attached 'L wing' expansion. The patio area is frequently seen in Beverly Hills, 90210, has been known for decades as the "Senior Patio," and is traditionally off-limits to underclassmen. The seniors of the class of 1975 never had access to the patio which was under renovation during their entire senior year. The Main Building received a major exterior restoration and interior modernization in the late 1970s and is the campus building most often seen on film.

The Long Beach earthquake (magnitude 6.4) on March 10, 1933, left its mark on the campus.  The quake destroyed the upper part of the original auditorium and caused the ground near it to sink several feet.  The area was nicknamed the "Sunken Garden" until rebuilt. The landmark auditorium replacing it was built in 1937 as a Works Progress Administration project while the elevated administrative offices were added in 1962.

The Ted T. Tanouye Memorial is located directly across from THS. Tanouye, class of 1938, was a technical sergeant in the US Army's 442nd Regimental Combat Team who was awarded the Medal of Honor posthumously. The memorial was dedicated in 2004 on the 60th anniversary of the Tanouye's heroic acts during World War II.

In 2018, Architectural Digest named Torrance High School the most beautiful high school in California.

Filming history
Torrance High's unique architecture and relative proximity to Hollywood Studios make it an ideal filming location for major television programs and motion pictures. Its credits include:
Television 
 Torrance High served as the facade of fictitious West Beverly High School in the Fox Network series Beverly Hills, 90210, and in The CW's spin-off, 90210; as the original Sunnydale High School, the alma mater of Buffy Summers in the WB Network series, Buffy the Vampire Slayer for the first three seasons; and as a location for the short-lived Fox Network series Skin. It was a filming location for the NBC drama Medium. It served as the facade for Ulysses S. Grant High School in The Secret Life of the American Teenager, which ran from 2008–2013.
Movies 
 Torrance High was used as the high school setting for the Freddie Prinze, Jr. movie She's All That.  Torrance High also played a prominent role in, The Wild Life, Not Another Teen Movie, Whatever It Takes, Cursed, Wild Things 3, and Bruce Almighty.
 All American High, a documentary film chronicling the life of the 1984 THS senior class, was filmed on the campus. The film is narrated by a Finnish exchange student, and observes 1980's California high school culture from a foreigner's perspective. All American High Revisited (2014) combines the original film with new footage of the film's principal subjects being interviewed on their high school years, the process of growing up, and the various paths in life that they took.

Activities

Torrance High has had a long successful athletic history winning many league titles in the current Pioneer League and also in the past Bay League.

Historic records

 The Baseball team won over 30 league titles including over 15 CIF titles.
 The Football team has won more than 20 league titles including over 10 CIF titles with one state title.
 The Boys Golf program has featured two CIF-Southern Section (CIF-SS) Individual Champions in Ted Oh who won the title in 1992 as a frosh denying Tiger Woods a clean sweep during his high school career (Tiger was the CIF-SS champion in 1991,93 and 94) and then Lucas Lee in 2004.
 The Girls' Golf team has won CIF-State Championships in 2005, 2007, 2008 and 2009 plus CIF-State Runner Up finishes in 2006, 2010 and 2011 for 7 consecutive CIF-State 1st or 2nd-place finishes.  From 2004 to 2011, the Girls Golf team captured 28 CIF post-season trophies for 1st or 2nd-place finishes including 26 in a row from the CIF-SS Team Divisionals, CIF-SS Team Finals, CIF-WSCGA State Regional and CIF-State Championships.  Current and past LPGA golfers Angela Park (CIF-SS Champion in 2003), Jane Rah (CIF-State Individual Champion 2005), and Jenny Shin (CIF-State Individual Champion 2008 & 2009) led the Tartars and won significant CIF individual titles.
 The Track & Field team won over 5 league titles including 1 CIF title and 1 state title.
 The Cross Country team won over 15 league titles including 3 CIF titles and 1 state title.
 The Wrestling team won more than 20 league titles including over 7 CIF titles.
 The Boys' Soccer team won over 10 league titles.
 The Boys' Basketball team won over 10 league titles.
 The Girls' Softball team won many league titles including many CIF titles.
 The Torrance High Marching Alliance was considered one of the top marching bands in the state.
 The NJROTC has won many titles until the program was disbanded in 2008 due to a 2008 budget cut.

Latest achievements
 The 2019-2020 Girls Varsity Soccer Team became the CIF SoCal Division IV Champions on March 7, 2020.
 The 2021-2022 Girls Varsity Volleyball Team became the CIF SoCal Division Champions with an undefeated season
 The Football team was the Pioneer League Champions in 2007-2008 being undefeated in the League.
 The Baseball team was the Pioneer League Champions in 2007-2008 being undefeated in the League.
 The Boys' Volleyball team was the Pioneer League Champions in 2007–2008.
 The Softball team was the Pioneer League Champions in 2007–2008, 2009–2010, 2014–2015 & 2015–2016.
 The Boys' Baseball team was the Pioneer League Champions (undefeated) and CIF Champions in 2007–2008.
 The Marching Alliance won the 2008 SCJA State Band Championships.
 The Boys' Tennis Team was the Pioneer League Champions (undefeated) in 2008–2009.
 The Girls' Golf team has appeared in 11 consecutive CIF-Southern Section (CIF-SS) Team Finals from 2002-2012 and finished in the top 10 each year (Championships in 2005, 2006, 2008, 2009, & 2010 with Runner-Up finishes in 2007 and 2011) for the 580 member CIF-SS high schools stretching from Santa Barbara to Palm Springs.
 The Boys' Baseball team was the Pioneer League Champions(undefeated)and CIF Runner-Up Champions in 2008–2009.
 The Girls' Tennis Team was the Pioneer League Champions in 2009–2010.
 The Boys' Baseball team was CIF Champions in 2013-2014
 The 2014-2015 softball team won the CIF Championship by beating Palmdale and Gatorade National Softball Player of the Year pitcher Rachel Garcia, 1–0, in a CIF championship record 13 innings and a game that lasted more than three hours (also a CIF record). Marissa Moreno pitched all 13 innings for Torrance (CIF Championship game record).

As an unofficial tradition, Torrance High has been known for many of its graduates enlisting with the U.S. military, particularly the Marine Corps.  Many alumni have gone on to become professional players, some before they even graduated. Deon Thompson graduated in 2006, and went on to play Basketball for UNC as a Forward. Angela Park became a professional golfer in April before her graduation in 2006, and went on to tie for second place in the LPGA US Women's Open of 2007. Angela would earn the 2007 LPGA Rookie of the Year Award.  Jenny Shin, Class of 2010, has competed on the LPGA Tour since 2011 and won the 2016 LPGA Volunteers of America Texas Shootout along with 22 career top 10 LPGA finishes.

Student groups are a significant part of student life, with service clubs like UNICEF and KIWIN'S, and academic groups such as Model United Nations and United States Academic Decathlon serving many interests. Cultural clubs are also available for students interested in another nationality's culture. The largest clubs at Torrance High by average attendance are Service League, CSF, Kiwins, UNICEF, Bible Club, KCC (Korean Culture Club), KFCC (Filipino Club) all averaging between 50-200 students each month.

Academics 

The school's alma mater is set to the ballad "Annie Lisle."

Torrance High offers 65,700 instructional minutes on a yearly basis and has nine minimum days for testing and/or staff development.

In 2004, Torrance High instated its Schoolwide Academic Goals in an effort to raise its education standards. Comprising an acronym of the mascot's name, they outline goals of technical competency and other standards.
Every year, about 50% of the seniors attend community colleges after graduating.

In 2009, 97% of Torrance High's students passed the CAHSEE exam.

Notable alumni

Military
 Louis Zamperini (1936) – Track star and World War II hero; 2015 Rose Parade Grand Marshal. Film and book Unbroken based on his life.
 Ted T. Tanouye (1938) – Medal of Honor Recipient in the Asian-American segregated unit during the Second World War, The 442nd Regimental Combat Team. A memorial is dedicated to him in front of the school.
 Gary R. Pfingston (1958) – 10th Chief Master Sergeant of the Air Force
 Rocky Chavez (1969) Politician. California State Assemblyman from the 76th District. Retired USMC Colonel

Entertainment
 Bobby Blotzer – drummer for Ratt
 Juan Croucier – bass player for Ratt and Dokken.
 Danny Gans – Singer, actor, impressionist
 Gregory Hatanaka – film director
 Dave Kerman – drummer
 Paul Moyer – television newscaster
 David Pack – leader of the band Ambrosia

Sports
 Fred Claire – General Manager of 1988 World Series champion Los Angeles Dodgers
 Kevin Higgins – former Major League Baseball player
 Fred Kendall – former Major League Baseball player and coach
 Jason Kendall – former Major League Baseball player 
 Lucas Lee - PGA Tour golfer, helped UCLA win the 2008 NCAA Men's Golf Championship
 Justin Miller – Major League Baseball player
 Yura Min – Olympic Ice Dancer
 Lisa Moretti – professional wrestler: Gorgeous Ladies of Wrestling and World Wrestling Entertainment champion under the name "Ivory"
 Angela Park – professional golfer, won LPGA 2007 Rookie of the Year Award
 Thierry Pham – professional bodybuilder and model
 Demi Runas - LPGA professional golfer since 2015
 Vladimir Morozov – bronze medalist in 2012 Summer Olympics; holds Russian record for 50m backstroke, 100m individual medley (short course meters)
 Townsend Saunders – Olympic medalist in freestyle wrestling; California state runner-Up 1985
 Jenny Shin - professional golfer since 2011, won the 2016 LPGA Volunteers of America Texas Shootout and has 22 top 10 finishes
 Tyrone Taylor – MLB player
 Deon Thompson (2006) – basketball player, North Carolina Tar Heels
 Antone Williamson – Major League Baseball player for Milwaukee Brewers
 Bart Johnson – Major League Baseball player 
 Steve Kealey – Major League Baseball player

References

External links 

 Official Torrance High School website
 Torrance High School Overview

Torrance High01
Education in Torrance, California
Public high schools in Los Angeles County, California
Torrance High01
Torrance High01
Educational institutions established in 1917
Torrance High01
Torrance High01